Runa is a feminine given name with multiple origins from different, unrelated cultures.

Runa or Rúna is a feminine given name of Old Norse origin meaning rune or secret lore. It is a feminine version of the name Rune. 

It is also in occasional use as a Japanese pronunciation of the name Luna. The name has been used in at least one instance as a nonstandard pronunciation in Japan for the Japanese kanji 月, also meaning moon. The name also has other meanings in Japanese depending on the kanji that are used to spell it.

Runa is also a name in use in Arabic as رنا, in Urdu as رونا, in Hindi as रूना and in Bangla as রুনা and is said to refer to the sixth month of the Islamic calendar.

People

American 
 Runa Lucienne (born 1988), model and actress

Bengali 

 Runa Basu, cricketer
 Runa Islam (born 1970), artist
 Runa Khan, actress
 Runa Laila (born 1952), singer

Canadian 
 Runa Reta (born 1980), squash player

Indian 
 Runa Rizvi, singer

Japanese 
 Runa Akiyama (1954-2014), actress
 Runa Imai (born 2000), swimmer
 Runa Konomi (born 2000), professional footballer
 Runa Takamura (1952–2004), J-pop singer, actress, and dancer

Nepalese 
 Runa Pradhan (born 1984), swimmer

Norwegian 
 Runa Førde (born 1933), painter, illustrator and graphic artist
 Runa Sandvik (born 1988), computer security expert
 Runa Vikestad (born 1984), footballer

Notes

Feminine given names